Peta Christine Mathias  is a New Zealand food writer and television show presenter and owns a television production company that produces food and travel shows. She is also known for leading gastronomic tours in the south of France, Morocco, Spain and India.

Biography
Mathias was born in Auckland. She initially trained as a nurse and worked at Auckland Hospital for five years. She then moved to Canada, where she lived for six years in Montreal and Vancouver working as a toxicotherapist in drug and alcohol treatment centres. Mathias then moved to London and to Paris and started working in restaurants, first as a dishwasher and later as a chef; eventually she bought a restaurant there, Rose Blues, and ran it for four years.

In 1990, Mathias returned to New Zealand and began to work in food writing and broadcasting. In 2006 she set up a company organising and leading culinary tours, and in 2008 she set up a production company, Red Head Media, to make food and travel television shows based on her travels.

Publications 
 Don't Get Saucy With Me Bernaise (1996), Random House New Zealand
 Fete Accomplie: A New Zealander's Culinary Romance 
Sirocco: In Search of Moorish Flavours (2002), Random House New Zealand
 Can We Help it if We're Fabulous (2008), Penguin Books 
Una questione di gusto (A Matter of Taste) with Fulvio Bonavia (2009), De Agostini 
 Burnt Barley: How to Eat, Drink and Sing your way around Ireland
 Just in Time to be Too Late (2009), Penguin Books 
 Fabulous: Thoughts on Being a Woman (2009), Random House New Zealand
 Culinary Adventures in Marrakech (2010), Penguin Books 
 French Toast: Eating and Laughing your way around France (2010), Penguin Books 
 Beat Till Stiff: A Woman's Recipe for Living (2011), Penguin Books 
Noodle Pillows: A Journey Through Vietnamese Food and Culture (2011), Exisle Publishing
 Never Put All Your Eggs in One Bastard (2016), Penguin Books 
 Hot Pink Spice Saga: an Indian Culinary Travelogue with Recipes with Julie Le Clerc (2014), Penguin Books

Awards and recognition
In 1997, Mathias won Best Segment in a Food Program at the World Food Media Awards for her segment on TVNZ's series Taste NZ. In 2003, she won the Supreme Award at the New Zealand Guild of Food Writers Culinary Quill Awards. In the 2012 Queen's Birthday and Diamond Jubilee Honours Mathias was appointed a Member of the New Zealand Order of Merit for services as an author and television presenter.

Her book Burnt Barley won Best Literary Food Writing (in English) category at the World Cookbook Fair. The book was released with an accompanying four-track CD of the same name (released on the Vintage label), on which Mathias sings Irish country songs.

In 2014, Hot Pink Spice Saga, which Mathias co-wrote with Julie Le Clerc, was shortlisted in the Best in the World for Indian Cookery category at the Gourmand World Cookbook Awards.

References

Living people
Year of birth missing (living people)
People from Auckland
21st-century New Zealand businesswomen
21st-century New Zealand businesspeople
Women cookbook writers
Members of the New Zealand Order of Merit
New Zealand memoirists
New Zealand food writers
Women food writers
20th-century New Zealand women writers
21st-century New Zealand women writers
20th-century New Zealand writers
21st-century New Zealand writers
Women memoirists